Chile Route 68 (Ruta 68) is a highway in central Chile. It runs  from Santiago to Valparaíso.

Route description 
It begins at the western terminus of Avenida Libertador General Bernardo O'Higgins. In its first kilometers the highway is straight and has three lanes in each direction. Shortly after its junction with Vespucio Norte Express, Route 68 narrows to two lanes in each direction. After this, the highway meets Costanera Norte and crosses the Mapocho River.

Going westward, Route 68 descends into the Curacaví Valley and bypasses the small city of the same name. After this, the highway is carried by another pair of tunnels side by side, which straddle the border between Santiago Metropolitan Region and Valparaíso Region and are called Zapata I and Zapata II. After leaving the tunnels, the highway continues northwest through the Casablanca Valley and borders the city of Casablanca. The highway enters the Lago Peñuelas National Reserve before continuing into Placilla de Peñuelas. 

Just north of Placilla, Route 68 intersects with the Acceso Sur a Valparaíso, formerly known as Camino La Pólvora, which is the new access road to the port the Valparaíso. From there the highway curves towards the north and splits into a Y-junction. The eastern road is named Variante Agua Santa and serves as access to the city of Viña del Mar. From this road branches off Route Las Palmas, which is part of Chile Route 60. The final stretch of Route 68, named Santos Ossa, makes a steep descent into Valparaíso.

References

Roads in Chile
Transport in Santiago Metropolitan Region
Transport in Valparaíso Region